SMS G96 was a large torpedo boat of the Imperial German Navy that was built and served during the First World War. She was the prototype ship of the 1916 Mobilisation Type torpedo boats, and was launched at Germaniawerft's Kiel shipyard on 19 September 1916, completing in December that year.

G96 was deployed to the Flanders Flotilla in February 1917 and took part in several raids on British shipping in the English Channel. She was sunk by a mine on 26 June 1917.

Construction and design
Work began in 1915 on construction of G96, the first example of an improved design of torpedo boat for the Imperial German Navy, which became known as the 1916 mobilisation type. The 1916 mobilisation type was an improved and enlarged derivative of the  that had formed the bulk of German torpedo boat construction since 1913. The major differences were a longer forecastle and more freeboard, both of which improved seakeeping.

The starboard shaft was also fitted with a cruising turbine.

The ship was armed with three 10.5 cm (4.1 in) SK L/45 guns and six 50 cm (19.7 in) torpedo tubes, with two single tubes forward and two twin tubes aft of the ship's funnels, with the twin tubes angled out by 15 degrees. Up to 40 mines could be carried. The ship had a crew of 105 officers and men.

G96 was launched on 16 September 1916 and was completed on 23 December that year.

Service
In February 1917, G96 was one of six large torpedo boats and four coastal torpedo boats that were sent as reinforcements to the German naval bases in Flanders, with the role of supporting submarine operations and carrying out offensive operations against the anti-submarine patrols and merchant shipping in the English Channel. G96 and the other nine torpedo boats arrived in Flanders on 18 February. On 25 February the Germans launched a major raid by the Flanders-based torpedo boats against Allied defences and shipping in the Channel. G96 s group carried out a brief bombardment of the North Foreland and Margate before withdrawing, hitting a house and killing three civilians but doing little other damage. The attack on the Dover Barrage withdrew after a confrontation with the British destroyer , while the patrol off the Mass encountered no ships.

The next major raid on the Channel took place on the night of March 17/18 1917. Two groups of torpedo boats, the seven ships of the 6th Flotilla and the five ships of the 1st Zeebrugge half-flotilla (V47, V67, V68, G95 and G96) were to operate against the Dover Barrage, with the 6th Flotilla attacking on the Northern side of the Channel and the  1st Zeebrugge half-flotilla operating to the south. Four more torpedo boats would attack shipping on the Downs. The 6th Flotilla encountered the British destroyer , on patrol in the Channel, and opened fire with guns and torpedoes. Paragon was hit by at least two torpedoes and sank. On seeing the explosion, the next destroyer in the British patrol line, proceeded southwards to investigate, and had just switched on her searchlight to rescue survivors when she was torpedoed and badly damaged by ships of the German 6th Flotilla, which escaped to the east, joining up with the torpedo boats of the  1st Zeebrugge half-flotilla, including G96. The attack on the Downs sank a small steamer, the Greypoint and attacked several drifters on patrol.

The Flanders-based torpedo boat flotillas continued to launch sorties against the Channel, with the next encounter with the Royal Navy occurring on the night of April 20/21, in the Battle of Dover Strait. Six torpedo boats (Group Gautier) were to bombard Dover and attack the Dover Barrage on the north side of the channel, with six more (Group Albrecht – V47, V68, G95 and G96) were to attack Calais and the southern part of the barrage. Three more torpedo boats were to operate near the Downs. Group Albrecht arrived off Calais at about 23:15 hr and fired about 300 shells before withdrawing. Group Gautier fired on and damaged an armed trawler, the Sabreur, and ineffectually shelled Dover.

Another major role of the Flanders-based torpedo boat flotillas was minesweeping, with the British laying extensive minefields to restrict operations of Flanders-based submarines. On 25 June 1917 G96 was escorting minesweepers clearing a minefield off the Flanders coast when she stuck a mine and sank. Four of her crew were killed.

References

Torpedo boats of the Imperial German Navy
World War I torpedo boats of Germany
Ships built in Kiel
1916 ships